This is a list of the known original copies of The Porter Garden Telescope. For information purposes, are also included those copies that their location are currently unknown, but there are records with some of their data.

See also 

 The Porter Garden Telescope

References 

1920s
History of astronomy
Telescopes